Anastasiya Usova (Rus: Анастасия Усова) (born 28 December 1988 in Aktobe, Kazakh, Soviet Union (present Kazakhstan)) is a Kazakhstani singer who rose to popularity after placing second in SuperStar KZ 3, the Kazakh version of Pop Idol. She had fewest votes to Nurzhan Kermenbayev.

Anastasiya includes Dilnaz Akhmadieva, Whitney Houston, and Irina Dubtsova among her main musical influences.

SuperStar KZ 3 performances
Theatre Round (Day Three): Махаббат Жалыны by Madina SadvaqasovaTop 40: Adagio by Lara FabianWildcard: Бакыт Кушагында by Shamshi KaldayakovaTop 12: Woman In Love by Barbra StreisandTop 11: Дольче Вита by ZhasminTop 10: Лесной Олень by Evgeniy KrylatovTop 9: Акапулько by Laima VaikuleTop 8: Махаббат Жалыны by Madina SadvaqasovaTop 7: Золотой by Dilnaz AkhmadiyevaTop 6: Қарлығаш by Daos InterneshilTop 5: Телефонная Книжка by Alla PugachevaTop 5: One Way Ticket by Neil SedakaTop 4: From Sarah with Love by Sarah ConnorTop 4: Февраль by Leonida Agutina & Anzheliki Varum (with Kayrat Tuntekov)Top 3: Listen With Your Heart by RoxetteTop 3: How Could An Angel Break My Heart? by Toni BraxtonTop 2: Сенен БаскаTop 2: ЛюбимыйTop 2: Атамекен by Roza Rimbayeva

External links
Interview with Anastasiya in Russian

1988 births
Living people
Idols (franchise) participants
People from Aktobe
SuperStar KZ
21st-century Kazakhstani women singers